Mun Ra-young (born 28 February 1996) is a South Korean skeleton racer who competes on the Skeleton World Cup circuit. She started racing in 2012 and was selected to the Korean national team in 2014.

References

External links
 

1996 births
South Korean female skeleton racers
Living people